Carmi Alderman Thompson (September 4, 1870 – June 22, 1942) was an American attorney and Republican politician in the U.S. state of Ohio who was Speaker of the Ohio House and Ohio Secretary of State from 1907 to 1911. He also fought in the Spanish–American War.

Biography

Carmi Thompson was born at Wayne County, West Virginia. He was moved to Ironton, Lawrence County, Ohio when he was three years old, where he graduated from Ironton High School in 1886.

Thompson graduated from Ohio State University in 1892, and taught at the High School in Bement, Illinois for two years. He returned to Ohio State, and graduated from the law school in 1895 with a degree Bachelor of Laws. He began practice in Ironton. He was appointed, and then elected City Solicitor of Ironton from 1896 to 1903.

Thompson was elected to the Ohio House of Representatives in 1903 and served in the 76th and 77th General Assemblies, 1904–1906. In the 77th General Assembly (1906), he was chosen Speaker of the House. In 1906, he was nominated, and then elected Secretary of State, resigned from the House, and served in 1907–1911.

During the Spanish–American War, Thompson was captain of Company I of the 7th O. U. S. V. I.  He was colonel of the 7th regiment, O.N.G., from 1901 to 1906. He was commander in chief of the United Spanish War Veterans in 1926.

He was Treasurer of the United States, and after 1913, he was in the iron ore and shipping business. In 1921 he was a member of the advisory committee to the conference on limitation of armaments held at Washington, D.C. In 1926, President Calvin Coolidge appointed him special commissioner to make a survey of the economic and internal conditions of the Philippines.

Thompson was nominated for Ohio Governor in 1922, but lost to Democrat A. Victor Donahey.

Thompson died  on June 22, 1942 at Cuyahoga County, Ohio, and was buried at Woodland Cemetery in Ironton.

Notes

References
 

Secretaries of State of Ohio
Republican Party members of the Ohio House of Representatives
People from Ironton, Ohio
1870 births
1942 deaths
Speakers of the Ohio House of Representatives
Ohio State University alumni
Ohio State University Moritz College of Law alumni
Treasurers of the United States
American military personnel of the Spanish–American War
People from Wayne County, West Virginia
Military personnel from Ohio